Tacca borneensis is a plant in the Dioscoreaceae family, native to west Borneo.

It was first described by Henry Nicholas Ridley in 1908.

Description
Ridley describes the plant as:

References

External links 

 Tacca borneensis images & occurrence data from GBIF

Plants described in 1908
Dioscoreaceae